The Enormous Radio and Other Stories is a collection of short fiction by John Cheever published in 1953 by Funk and Wagnalls. All fourteen stories were first published individually in The New Yorker. These works are included in  The Stories of John Cheever (1978) published by Alfred A. Knopf.

Stories
The date of publication in The New Yorker appears in parenthesis.
 "The Sutton Place Story" (June 29, 1946)
 "The Enormous Radio" (May 17, 1947)
 "Torch Song" (October 4, 1947)
 "O City of Broken Dreams" (January 24, 1948)
 "The Summer Farmer" (August 7, 1948)
 "The Hartleys" (January 22, 1949)
 "Christmas is a Sad Season for the Poor" (December 24, 1949)
 "The Season of Divorce" (March 4, 1950)
 "The Pot of Gold" (October 14, 1950)
 "Clancy in the Tower of Babel" (March 24, 1951)
 "Goodbye, My Brother" (August 25, 1951)
 "The Children" (March 6, 1952)
 "The Superintendent" (March 29, 1952)
 "The Cure" (July 3, 1952)

Publication history
Cheever, in an effort to see a selection of his stories published in the 1940s with The New Yorker collected in a volume, approached Random House's Robert Linscott: Cheever had been under contract with the publisher to deliver a novel since 1946. Linscott demurred, and Cheever arranged to have fourteen stories printed by Funk and Wagnalls, a publisher of encyclopedias.

Reception
Literary critic James Kelly of The New York Times Book Review, praised Cheever's "miraculous expressions" in describing the denizens of the petty-bourgeois New England suburbs, a genre of which Kelly identifies the author as a literary master. William Peden of The Saturday Evening Post, though ranking Cheever among "the most undervalued American short story writers", regarded The Enormous Room and Other Stories as inferior to author J. D. Salinger's short fiction collection  Nine Stories (1953), as did critic Alfred Mizener in The New Republic.
Blake Bailey reports "...a mostly favorable reception for The Enormous Radio", adding that it "sold a few copies and vanished.", while Patrick Meanor notes that the collection "met with very mixed reviews."

Critical assessment
The stories in The Enormous Radio were clearly an advance over the short fiction issued in Cheever's first collection The Way Some People Live (1943). Biographer Lynne Waldeland writes:

Biographer Patrick Meanor traces the "dramatic growth" in Cheever's handling of narrative and themes evident in The Enormous Radio and Other Stories to the author's extensive "journal-keeping", much it written while Cheever was in his thirties. Meanor declares that these self-reflective writings "directly influenced" the development of Cheever's fiction:

Meanor notes that a number of stories included in The Enormous Room and Other Stories, among them "Goodbye, My Brother"; "Torch Song" and "The Enormous Radio", would alone have "secured Cheever a permanent place in the pantheon of American short story writers."

Lynne Waldeland cites the same three stories, offering them as evidence for Cheever's emergence as a modern innovator in short fiction.

Footnotes

Sources 
Bailey, Blake. 2009 (1). Notes on Text in John Cheever: Collected Stories and Other Writing. The Library of America. pp.1025-1028 
 Bailey, Blake. 2009 (2). Cheever: A Life. Alfred A. Knopf, New York. 770 pp. 
Meanor, Patrick. 1995. John Cheever Revisited. Twayne Publishers, New York. 
O’Hara, James E. 1989. John Cheever: A Study of the Short Fiction. Twayne Publishers, Boston Massachusetts. Twayne Studies in Short Fiction no 9. 
Waldeland, Lynne. 1979. John Cheever. Twayne Publishers, G. K. Hall & Co., Boston, Massachusetts. 

Short story collections by John Cheever
1953 short story collections